Mathias Cole Anderle (born July 3, 1993) is an American singer-songwriter, born and raised in Puyallup, Washington, United States. Anderle's stylistic influences include reggae, pop, rock, folk, jazz, and hip hop.

Anderle played the male lead in the Nickelodeon film School Gyrls, which was written and directed by Nick Cannon and released his first single "Shine On".

Personal life
Anderle was born in Puyallup, Washington. By the age of 5, he was singing and performing at local church productions. He taught himself how to play the guitar at the age of 10 and began playing the local coffee house circuit while he was still in Jr. High School. Mathias co-writes most of his own songs and his influences are varied. He attended public school at Hunt Elementary, Ferrucci Jr. High, Glacier View Jr. High and would have gone to Emerald Ridge High but he relocated to Los Angeles to pursue his acting, singing and modeling career.

Music career
In 2010, Anderle released his first single "Shine On" under the record label Razor & Tie which is featured on the Kidz Bop 17 album. The single peaked at #14 on iTunes.

He then released another single late summer 2010 entitled "Summertime" which peaked at #13 on iTunes. On March 11, 2011 he released a free single off his upcoming mixtape call "Gone". Mathias was part of a boy band called "Invasion" and was touring public schools. He was also part of a boy band called The Boy Band Project, with 4 others including Levi Mitchell, Brandon Pulido, Nick Dean, Zac Mann. They toured public schools and have various fans throughout most of America. The Boy Band Project released the single " Find that girl" in 2013. The group parted ways in February 2014 announced over Twitter.

Acting career
Anderle played the lead male role of Colin in the Nick Cannon film School Gyrls which debuted in early 2010 on Nickelodeon and Teen Nick.  Also in 2010 he was an extra in the Kate Voegele music video for "99 Times" as well as the Jason Castro music video "Let's Just Fall in Love Again".  He is featured in a "Baby Bottle Pop" commercial in which he sings the jingle.  In 2011 he was an extra in the Caitlyn Taylor Love music video "Even If It Kills Me".

Discography

Singles
 "Shine On" (2010)
 "Summertime" (2010)
 "Gone" (2011)
 " Find that Girl" (2013)

References

External links

 

Living people
Singers from Washington (state)
American reggae musicians
American male film actors
American child singers
American male television actors
Male models from Washington (state)
Child pop musicians
People from Puyallup, Washington
Guitarists from Los Angeles
Guitarists from Washington (state)
1993 births